Ralph Bany (born 1 September 1964) is a former German footballer.

Bany came to German Oberliga club 1. FC Pforzheim after playing for the clubs SV Rot and VfL Kirchheim/Teck. In 1989, he changed for a transfer fee of 50,000 German Mark together with his Pforzheim colleague Eberhard Carl to the Bundesliga club Karlsruher SC. In his first term he already played 26 times. He lost his defense position within the second half of the season 1990–91 which led to only five assignments in two terms altogether. In 1993, he left the Karlsruher SC and changed to the Oberliga club TSF Ditzingen. He continued his career in the German Football Oberliga Baden-Württemberg at Kirchheim/Teck and Bahlinger SC as well as in the German Verbandsliga Baden at ASV Durlach.

References

1964 births
Living people
German footballers
Bundesliga players
ASV Durlach players
VfL Kirchheim/Teck players
Association football defenders
Bahlinger SC players